RAAF Base Glenbrook  is a Royal Australian Air Force (RAAF) base located in Glenbrook, in the Lower Blue Mountains, approximately  west of the Sydney central business district in New South Wales, Australia.

The base serves as home to Headquarters Air Command of the RAAF. There is no airfield although it has a heliport, or helicopter landing site (HLS) and most administrative services are located on the nearby RAAF Base Richmond. Parts of the  site are heritage-listed and comprise the Officers' Mess, once the  Hotel.

During World War Two, men stationed at the base co-ordinated the stockpiling of mustard gas in the disused Glenbrook railway tunnel.

In 2009 the Minister for Defence, John Faulkner, announced that the base would be closed by 2015, and its command operations transfer to RAAF Base Amberley. Closure has yet to occur.

Units

See also
List of Royal Australian Air Force installations
List of airports in New South Wales

References

External links

Royal Australian Air Force bases
Heliports in Australia
Military installations in New South Wales
Glenbrook, New South Wales